The Main Suburban railway line is the technical name for the trunk railway line between Redfern railway station and Parramatta railway station in Sydney, Australia, but now generally refers to the section between Redfern and where the Old Main South Line branches off at Granville Junction. The railway line then continues on as the Main Western line towards the Blue Mountains. This term distinguished this trunk line from the Illawarra Line which branched south from the Illawarra Junction to Wollongong, and later the North Shore tracks which carried trains north over the Harbour Bridge.

History

The Main Suburban line between Redfern and Granville was the first railway line to be constructed in New South Wales. The first company to start rail transport in New South Wales was the Sydney Railway Company which was incorporated on 10 October 1849 with the aim of building a railway from Sydney to Parramatta.  Capital was raised, shares were sold, and a route was surveyed. The first sod was turned by Mrs Keith Stewart (daughter of the Governor) at Cleveland Paddocks (an area between the southern end of the current Central station and Cleveland Street) on 20 May 1850.

The original engineer appointed was Francis Webb Sheilds, an Irishman. He persuaded the New South Wales legislature to pass an Act on 27 July 1852 requiring all railways in the colony to be of  gauge. This was the gauge in use in Ireland and is now referred to as  gauge. After Sheilds resigned due to difficulties, a Scot named James Wallace was appointed. Wallace persuaded the legislature to repeal the previous act and replace it, on 4 August 1853, with one requiring a gauge of  – the current standard gauge. (Unfortunately for Australia, the legislation requiring the broad gauge had been noted in the colonies of Victoria and South Australia and some rolling stock ordered.)

The Sydney Railway Company encountered many troubles: engineers came and went; real estate required became expensive and difficult to acquire; money, supplies and manpower ran short, partly because of a gold rush. Eventually the property of the Sydney Railway Company was transferred to the government of New South Wales on 3 September 1855.

The line opened on 26 September 1855, from Sydney to Parramatta Junction (near Granville Station), with stations at Newtown, Ashfield, Burwood and Homebush.
The Sydney terminal station was on the south side of Devonshire Street, just south of the current Central Station. Although the vicinity was sometimes referred to as Redfern, it was not near the current Redfern station.

The line was quadrupled to Flemington in 1892. The line saw its most dramatic change in the period 1926–1927, when the section from Redfern to Homebush was expanded from 4 to 6 tracks by the addition of 2 tracks initially intended for non-electric express trains. Prior to 1926, all stations on the line had platform faces to all four tracks, and the tracks were labelled as 'fast' and 'slow'. After the completion of works in 1927, only Redfern and Strathfield had platform faces on all six tracks. The four tracks now known as the 'Up and Down Local lines' and the 'Up and Down Suburban Lines' were electrified in 1928. It was not until 1955 that the 'Up and Down Main Lines' were also electrified to coincide with the opening of the Blue Mountains electrification programme.

Double-deck trailer cars were introduced between 1964–67 replacing old wooden trailer cars in the Iine's electric multiple unit passenger trains.

Description of route
The line commences at the Illawarra Junction south of Redfern station, the junction point of the Illawarra railway line. The line consists of three pairs of electrified tracks, six in total, which head west through the Inner Western suburbs of Sydney to Strathfield. The tracks are named 'Up' and 'Down' Main', 'Up' and 'Down' Suburban, and 'Up' and 'Down' Local. The 'Main' lines are express lines which have no intermediate platforms between Redfern and Burwood, and usually carry Intercity, Interstate, Heritage, or express suburban trains. The inner 'Suburban' pair of tracks have some intermediate platforms and generally carry express or limited stops suburban train services (usually North Shore & Western Line suburban services). The southernmost 'Local' pair of tracks have platforms at all intermediate stations and carry all-stations and some limited stops services (usually Inner West & Leppington Line suburban services).

At Strathfield, there is a grade separated junction with the Main North Line. Northern line trains on the suburban tracks switch onto the Main North, along with Central Coast & Newcastle Line trains on the main tracks. There is also a single track link that takes freight trains from the Main North west, joining onto a goods line that runs parallel to the Main Suburban. At the next station, Homebush, the local tracks end. Generally, trains on the suburban track merge onto the main, while trains on the local either terminate or merge on the suburban track. The line then continues to Flemington, where there is a complex double triangle junction around Flemington Maintenance Depot, which provides access from the main tracks to the Olympic Park line and the Sydney Freight Network. The goods line turns into the Sydney Freight Network (also known as the Metropolitan Goods Line) here.

A bit further down is Lidcombe, where there is another triangle junction, connecting the suburban tracks to the Main Southern railway line. Continuing down the line, there are further junctions with various yards and workshops at Auburn, including Auburn Maintenance Centre and Maintrain, and the now closed Carlingford railway line at Clyde. At Granville, the line ends with a triangle junction, continuing onto either the Main Western Line or the Old Main South line.

Speed limits on the route vary between locations and tracks (main, suburban or local). The suburban and local tracks vary between  limits. The limits on the suburban and local reduce to  around bridges on curves at Newtown and Ashfield, as the bridges have their supports between the running lines, with a risk of bridge collapse if a train were to derail at high speed, similar to the Granville rail disaster.

Stations

See also
The CBD Relief Line was proposed to connect to the Main lines.
Railways in Sydney for an overview of railways in Sydney.
Sydney Trains for the organisation responsible for running electric passenger trains in Sydney.

References

Citations

Sources